Alexander Vdovin (born 21 August 1993) is a Russian cyclist, who currently rides for UCI Continental team . His twin brother Sergey Vdovin is also a professional cyclist.

Major results
2016
 1st  Young rider classification Volta a Portugal
 3rd Prueba Villafranca de Ordizia
2017
 8th Prueba Villafranca de Ordizia
 2018
 1st Stage 3 Tour of Iran (Azerbaijan)
2019
 9th GP Miguel Induráin

References

External links

1993 births
Living people
Russian male cyclists
People from Votkinsk
Sportspeople from Udmurtia